Frank Vaganée (born 19 March 1966, in Mechelen) is a Belgian jazz saxophonist and composer. He has his own trio with Philippe Aerts recently replaced by Rosario Bonnacorso on the double bass, and Dré Pallemaerts on drums.  He is co-leader of the Frank Vaganée/Mike Del Ferro Quartet and also is the artistic leader of the Brussels Jazz Orchestra.  He won the Belgian Golden Django award for best artist in 2001.

References

External links
 biography on the Jazz in Belgium site

Belgian jazz musicians
Jazz saxophonists
1966 births
Living people
Musicians from Mechelen
21st-century saxophonists